The Women's Improvement Club of Hueneme is located at 239 E. Scott St. in Port Hueneme, Ventura County, California. It is a historic club whose building is listed on the National Register of Historic Places.

Club
In 1989, the club was the oldest women's clubhouse in all of Ventura County and was still active.  It was founded in 1909 by 15 women with goals to improve the town and to create a library.  The club opened a library in 1909 at the A.O.U.W.

Clubhouse
The Bungalow style clubhouse building was opened in 1915 as a clubhouse and library. It served as the town's library until 1935.

In 1935 it succeeded in having a regular public library opened.

Also known as Women's Improvement Club, it was listed on the National Register of Historic Places in 1989.  The listing included one contributing building and one contributing site.

See also
 Ebell Club of Santa Paula
 List of women's club buildings
 Ventura County Library System
National Register of Historic Places listings in Ventura County, California
 Ventura County Historic Landmarks & Points of Interest

References

External links
"LANDMARKS / COUNTY HISTORICAL SITES : Monument to Decades of Improvement"; by Kathleen Williams, Los Angeles Times. May 7, 1992.

Women's club buildings in California
Buildings and structures in Ventura County, California
Port Hueneme, California
Clubs and societies in California
Women's clubs in the United States
Buildings and structures completed in 1915
Clubhouses on the National Register of Historic Places in California
National Register of Historic Places in Ventura County, California
Historic districts on the National Register of Historic Places in California
History of women in California
Bungalow architecture in California